Mo McRae (born July 4, 1982) is an American actor, writer and producer, best known for his recurring role as Tyler in the FX series Sons of Anarchy as well as Leon Hayes in the 2006 film Gridiron Gang. He starred in Fox's Pitch.

Raised in South Los Angeles, McRae turned to acting for solace. After enrolling in a drama class at Washington Preparatory High School, McRae opted to forgo his spot on the basketball team when he landed the lead in the school play.

Career

After high school, McRae pursued his new found dream as an artist in the entertainment industry. After being signed by an agent, he quickly began to book national television spots for major corporations such as Visa, Nike and Reebok, among many others. These spots opened the doors to some early primetime guest appearances on shows such as NYPD Blue, Becker and Boston Public. Other television work soon followed with appearances on CSI: Crime Scene Investigation, ER and The Shield.

In 2006, McRae was introduced to a much wider audience. He played one of the lead roles in the hit film Gridiron Gang opposite Dwayne Johnson, inhabiting the role of the troubled quarterback "Leon Hayes". The Neal H. Moritz–produced film grossed more than $40 million worldwide.

As McRae became more successful as an actor, he began to build an interest behind the camera. He produced and starred in The Fall which competed at the Cannes Film Festival in 2008. Additionally, he wrote a screenplay No Return with acclaimed movie and television writer Harry Winer. The film is currently set-up at Smash Media. Since 2012 he has had a recurring major guest role in the FX drama Sons of Anarchy.

In 2010, McRae appeared in Carmen Madden's film Everyday Black Man.  Also that year,  McRae recurred on the ABC drama Detroit 1-8-7 as Pooch and also filmed a lead role in the indie film The Deadliest Lesson opposite Penelope Ann Miller and Yancey Arias.

In total, McRae has appeared in over 30 film and television projects over the past decade. He currently resides in Los Angeles.

Personal life

Mo McRae married Lex Scott Davis on July 21, 2019,  after less than a year of being engaged. They had an "unplugged" wedding to ensure that all of their guests were "present in the moment" as they shared personalized vows. The couple met on the set of The First Purge. They welcomed their first child, a son, in July 2020.

Filmography

Film/Movie

Television

References

 Baker, Ralph (June 2012) "Who is Mo McRae?" at Rags N Riches Magazine
 Madison, Linda (7 Nov 2010) "Exclusive! Mo McRae Returns to Detroit 1-8-7" at Hollywood Official
 Smash Media Brings Film Project to Michigan at Michigan Movie Magazine

External links
 
 Mo McRae at The New York Times
 "Actors Lex Scott Davis and Mo McRae Are Married" at People.com

1982 births
21st-century American male actors
African-American male actors
American male film actors
American male television actors
Living people
Male actors from Los Angeles
21st-century African-American people
20th-century African-American people